This article contains information about the literary events and publications of 1872.

Events

March
The Federation of Madrid expels Paul Lafargue and all other signatories to an ostensibly subversive article in La Emancipación.
Serialisation of Sheridan Le Fanu's Gothic vampire novella Carmilla ends in the monthly The Dark Blue. Later this year it appears in his collection In a Glass Darkly. Set in the Duchy of Styria, it helps to introduce the lesbian vampire genre.
June 15 – Thomas Hardy's second novel (and the first set in Wessex), Under the Greenwood Tree, is published in London (as "by the author of Desperate Remedies").
June 19 – The Bibliothèque nationale et universitaire is founded in Strasbourg as the Kaiserliche Universitäts- und Landesbibliothek zu Straßburg, a public regional and academic library for the new German territory of Alsace-Lorraine (Reichsland Elsass-Lothringen) after destruction of its predecessors in the Siege of Strasbourg in the Franco-Prussian War.
July – Rose la Touche rejects a proposal from John Ruskin for the last time.
July 7 – Paul Verlaine abandons his family for London with Arthur Rimbaud.
September 13 (O. S.: September 1) – Romanian poet Mihai Eminescu first attends the literary club Junimea of Iași and reads out his fantasy story Poor Dionis (Sărmanul Dionis). It is poorly received by the Junimists.
September 30 – George MacDonald arrives in Boston for a lecture tour of the United States.
November (approximate date) – Lafcadio Hearn becomes a reporter on the Cincinnati Daily Enquirer.
December 3 – Assyriologist George Smith presents the first translation of the Epic of Gilgamesh to a meeting of the Society of Biblical Archaeology in London.
December 22 – Jules Verne's novel Around the World in Eighty Days (Le Tour du monde en quatre-vingts jours) finishes serialisation (since November 2) in the daily Le Temps, the day after the concluding date of the narrative.
unknown dates 
Benito Pérez Galdós begins Trafalgar, the first in the series of historical novels known as Episodios Nacionales. 
The first university course in American Literature is held at Princeton University by John Seely Hart.
The Scottish Gaelic magazine Féillire first appears as Almanac Gàilig air son 1872 in Inverness.

New books

Fiction
Machado de Assis – Ressurreição
Mary Elizabeth Braddon – To the Bitter End
Rhoda Broughton
Good-bye, Sweetheart!
Poor Pretty Bobby
Samuel Butler – Erewhon
Edward Bulwer-Lytton – The Parisians
Wilkie Collins – Poor Miss Finch
Annie Hall Cudlip – A Passion in Tatters
Alphonse Daudet – Tartarin de Tarascon
Fyodor Dostoevsky – Demons (Бесы, Bésy)
Alexandre Dumas, père – Création et rédemption
George Eliot – Middlemarch (serial publication concluded)
Mihai Eminescu – Poor Dionis (Sărmanul Dionis)
Thomas Hardy – Under the Greenwood Tree
Mór Jókai
Eppur si muove – És mégis mozog a Föld (And yet the Earth moves)
The Man with the Golden Touch (Az arany ember)
Sheridan Le Fanu
In a Glass Darkly
Willing to Die
Nikolai Leskov – The Cathedral Folk (Соборяне, Soboryane)
Eliza Lynn Linton – The True History of Joshua Davidson, Christian and Communist
Margaret Oliphant – At His Gates
Bayard Taylor – Beauty and The Beast, and Tales of Home
Anthony Trollope – The Golden Lion of Granpere
Jules Verne
The Adventures of Three Englishmen and Three Russians in South Africa (Aventures de trois Russes et de trois Anglais dans l'Afrique australe)
The Fur Country (Le Pays des fourrures)
Émile Zola – La Curée

Children and young adults
R. D. Blackmore – The Maid of Sker
Frances Freeling Broderip – Tiny Tadpoles, and Other Tales
Juliana Horatia Ewing – A Flat Iron for a Farthing
George MacDonald – The Princess and the Goblin
E. J. Richmond – The Jewelled Serpent
Susan Coolidge – What Katy Did (first in the What Katy Did series of five books)
Ouida – A Dog of Flanders

Drama
François Coppée – Les Bijoux de la Délivrance
Franz Grillparzer – The Jewess of Toledo (Die Jüdin von Toledo, first performed posthumously, written 1851)
Prosper Mérimée – La Chambre bleue (published posthumously)
August Strindberg – Master Olof
Ivan Turgenev – A Month in the Country («Месяц в деревне», Mesiats v derevne, first performed)

Poetry
José Hernández – Martín Fierro (first part)

Non-fiction
Chambers's English Dictionary
William Cullen Bryant – Picturesque America, vol. 1
John Evans – The Ancient Stone Implements, Weapons and Ornaments of Great Britain
Warren Felt Evans – Mental Medicine
Sophia Jex-Blake – Medical Women: A Thesis and a History
Friedrich Nietzsche – The Birth of Tragedy (Die Geburt der Tragödie aus dem Geiste der Musik)
Alexandru Papadopol-Calimah – Scrieri vechi perdute atingetóre de Dacia (Old Lost Writings Relating to Dacia; first installments)
Henry Wilson – History of the Rise and Fall of the Slave Power in America, vols. 1 & 2

Births
January 31 – Zane Grey, American Western novelist (died 1939)
March 31 – Mary Lewis Langworthy, American pageant writer (died 1949)
April 4 – Frida Uhl, Austrian writer (died 1943)
May 2 – Ichiyō Higuchi, Japanese writer (died 1896)
May 21 (May 9 O.S.) – Teffi, born Nadezhda Alexandrovna Lokhvitskaya, Russian-born humorist (died 1952)
May 31 – W. Heath Robinson, English cartoonist and illustrator (died 1944)
June 27 – Paul Laurence Dunbar, African American poet, novelist and playwright (died 1906)
August 24 – Max Beerbohm, English essayist and parodist (died 1956)
September 15 – Frances Garnet Wolseley, English horticulturist and garden writer (died 1936)
September 22 – Eleanor Hallowell Abbott, American fiction writer and poet (died 1958)
October 8 – John Cowper Powys, Anglo-Welsh novelist (died 1963)
October 10 – Arthur Talmage Abernethy, American theologian and poet (died 1956)
October 18 (October 6 O.S.) – Mikhail Kuzmin, Russian poet, novelist and composer (died 1936)
October 20 – F. M. Mayor, English novelist (died 1932)
November 23 – Eraclie Sterian, Romanian science writer and playwright (died 1948)
December 28 – Pío Baroja, Spanish novelist (died 1956)

Deaths

January 21 – Franz Grillparzer, Austrian poet and dramatist (born 1791)
February 6 – Sir Thomas Phillipps, English book collector (born 1792)
March 4 – Carsten Hauch, Danish poet (born 1790)
March 10 – Giuseppe Mazzini, Italian philosopher, journalist and politician (born 1805)
March 11 – Emily Taylor, English author, poet and hymn writer (born 1795)
April 1 – Frederick Denison Maurice, English theologian (born 1805)
April 13 – Samuel Bamford, English essayist and poet (born 1788)
April 20 – Ljudevit Gaj, Croatian linguist and journalist (born 1809)
May 13 – Moritz Hartmann, German poet (born 1821)
May 29 – Frank Key Howard, American journalist and memoirist (born 1826)
June 1 – Charles Lever, Irish novelist (born 1806)
July 25 – Gregorio Gutiérrez González, Colombian poet (born 1826)
August 8 – Heinrich Abeken, German theologian (born 1809)
September 22 – Vladimir Dal, Russian lexicographer (born 1801)
September 18 – Herbert Haines, English historian and Anglican theologian (born 1826)
October 10 – Fanny Fern, American journalist, novelist and children's writer (born 1811)
October 21 – Jean-Henri Merle d'Aubigné, Swiss historian (born 1794)
November 16 – William Gilham, American military writer (born 1818)
December 23 – Théophile Gautier, French poet and novelist (born 1811)

References

 
Years of the 19th century in literature